USS LST-342 was an  built for the United States Navy during World War II. LST-342 was laid down on 21 August 1942 by the Norfolk Navy Yard; launched on 8 November 1942; sponsored by Mrs. Philip H. Ryan; and commissioned on 31 December 1942.
 
She was assigned to the Asiatic-Pacific theater and participated in the New Georgia-Rendova-Vangunu occupation in July 1943. The resultant explosion broke the ship into two sections, with the stern sinking immediately, while the bow remained afloat and was towed to Purvis Bay (Tokyo Bay) off Florida Island and beached so that usable equipment could be salvaged. The bow was then abandoned.

She was struck from the Navy list on 28 July 1943. LST-342 earned one battle star and the Navy Unit Commendation for World War II service.

See also
 List of United States Navy LSTs

References

External links
 
 

1942 ships
Ships built in Portsmouth, Virginia
LST-1-class tank landing ships of the United States Navy
World War II amphibious warfare vessels of the United States
Ships sunk by Japanese submarines
Maritime incidents in July 1943